This is a list of Utah writers.

A

Edward Abbey (1927-1989) - environmental fiction & nonfiction
Thomas G. Alexander (born 1935) - history
James B. Allen (born 1927) - history
Jack Anderson (1922–2005) – journalism, nonfiction
Nephi Anderson (1865–1923) - religious/family values fiction
Leonard J. Arrington (1917–1999) – history, nonfiction
Montgomery Atwater (1904-1976) - nonfiction & youth fiction

B
Will Bagley (born 1950) – history, nonfiction
Paul Dayton Bailey (1906–1987) – history, nonfiction
Roseanne Barr (born 1952) – screenplays
Rick Bass (born 1958) – fiction, nonfiction, 
Ken Brewer (1941–2006) - poetry, nonfiction
Fawn M. Brodie (1915–1981) – history, nonfiction
Juanita Brooks (1898–1989) – history, nonfiction
John Brown (born 1966) – fantasy, thrillers, science fiction
Marilyn Brown (born 1939) – religious fiction, poetry, nonfiction
Jan Harold Brunvand (born 1933) – folklore, nonfiction
D. J. Butler – fantasy, science fiction, horror, juvenile, young adult

C

Frank J. Cannon (1859–1933) – journalism, nonfiction
Orson Scott Card (born 1951) – science fiction, fantasy, horror, historical fiction, nonfiction
Ron Carlson (born 1969) – literary fiction, young adult, poetry, nonfiction
Nathan Keonaona Chai – literary fiction, screenplays
John Cheever (1912–1982) – literary fiction
Clayton M. Christensen (1952–2020) - business, nonfiction
Katharine Coles – poetry
Ally Condie (born 1978) – science fiction, fantasy, young adult, juvenile
Arianne Cope – religious fiction, historical fiction, nonfiction
Larry Correia (born 1977) – urban fantasy, science fiction
Stephen Covey (1932–2012) – self-help, business, nonfiction

D
James Dashner (born 1972) – science fiction, fantasy, juvenile
Bernard DeVoto (1897–1955) – history, nonfiction
Howard R. Driggs (1873–1963) – historical fiction, nonfiction
H. Wayne Driggs (1902–1951) – playwright
Brian Lee Durfee – epic fantasy, horror

E
Richard Paul Evans (born 1962) - religious fiction, science fiction
Brian Evenson (born 1966) – literary fiction, horror, nonfiction

F
Linnie Findlay (1919–2009) – history, nonfiction
Vardis Fisher (1895–1968) – historical fiction
John D. Fitzgerald (1906–1988) – humor, slice-of-life, nonfiction
Becca Fitzpatrick (born 1979) – fantasy
Nancy Fulda – science fiction, science, nonfiction
John Fulton (born 1967) – literary fiction

G
Susa Young Gates (1856–1933) – historical fiction, biographies, nonfiction
Paul Genesse (born 1973) – fantasy, science fiction, horror
Jessica Day George (born 1976) – fantasy, juvenile, young adult
Brewster Ghiselin (1903–2002) - poetry, nonfiction
James Goldberg - poetry, non-fiction, fantasy, historical fiction, general fiction, playwright

H
Shannon Hale (born 1974) – fantasy, science fiction, juvenile, young adult
Mette Ivie Harrison (born 1970) – fantasy, young adult, mystery, nonfiction
Laura Hickman (born 1956) – fantasy, science fiction, game scenarios
Tracy Hickman (born 1955) – fantasy, science fiction, game scenarios
Charlie Holmberg (born 1988) - fantasy, romance, young adult
Dean Hughes (born 1943) – historical fiction, juvenile fiction

I
Chris Ireland – science, medicine, nonfiction
Reed Irvine (1922–2004) – economics, nonfiction
Wilton Ivie (1907–1969) – science, biology, nonfiction
Janet Iwasa – science, nonfiction
Reed McNeil Izatt (born 1926) – science, nonfiction

J
Janet Kay Jensen (born 1951) – literary fiction
Raymond F. Jones (1915–1994) – science fiction

K
Ardyth Kennelly (1912–2005) – pulp romance, historical fiction, poetry, nonfiction
Josi S. Kilpack (born 1974) – mystery, historical romance, literary fiction

L
Neil LaBute (born 1963) – screenplays
Annette Lyon (born 1973) – religious fiction, romance, nonfiction

M
Maddox (George Ouzounian; born 1978) – humor, nonfiction
Susan Evans McCloud (born 1945) – songwriter, historical fiction, biographies, screenwriter
Ellen Meloy (1946–2004)
James Merendino (born 1969) – screenplays
Adrienne Monson (born 1983) – paranormal romance, urban fantasy
Thomas S. Monson (1927–2018) – religious nonfiction, inspirational nonfiction, history
Heather B. Moore – romance fiction, thriller, fantasy, historical fiction, religious fiction
Dale Morgan (1914–1971) – history, nonfiction
Brandon Mull (born 1974) – fantasy, juvenile

N
Jennifer A. Nielsen (born 1971) – historical fiction, young adult, fantasy
Brenda Novak (born 1964) – historical romance, contemporary romance
Rachel Ann Nunes (born 1966) – literary fiction, romance, religious fiction

O
Peter Orullian – fantasy, religious fiction, songwriter

P
Helen Z. Papanikolas (1917–2004) – history, literary fiction, nonfiction
Benson Y. Parkinson (born 1960) – religious fiction, historical fiction, biographies
Jay A. Parry (born 1950) – literary fiction, science fiction, poetry, religious fiction, self-help, nonfiction
Steven L. Peck (born 1957) – poetry, religious fiction, science, science fiction, fantasy, nonfiction
Todd Robert Petersen (born 1969) – literary fiction, satire, nonfiction
Levi S. Peterson (born 1933) – biographies, nonfiction, literary fiction
Aprilynne Pike (born 1981) – fantasy, young adult
Louise Plummer – juvenile, nonfiction

Q
D. Michael Quinn (1944–2021) – history, nonfiction

R
Natacha Rambova (1897–1966) – nonfiction, biographies
James E. Reilly (1948–2008) – screenplays
Jeff Rivera (born 1976) – contemporary fiction, young adult
B. H. Roberts (1857–1933) – history, nonfiction
Peter Rock (born 1967) – literary fiction

S

Eric Samuelsen (born 1956) – theatrical plays
Brandon Sanderson (born 1975) – fantasy, science fiction
Joseph Santley (1889–1991) – theatrical plays
Ronald B. Scott (1945–2020) – biographies, journalism, nonfiction
Brent Scowcroft (born 1925) – politics, nonfiction
Richard Scowcroft (1916–2001) – historical fiction, literary fiction
Cosy Sheridan (born 1964) – songwriter
Elizabeth Smart (born 1987) – nonfiction, biographies
Eliza R. Snow (1804–1887) - poetry, nonfiction
Virginia Sorensen (1912–1991) - religious fiction, historical fiction
Anita Stansfield (born 1961) – contemporary romance, historical romance
Page Stegner (1937–2017) – historical fiction, history, nonfiction
Wallace Stegner (1909–1993) - religious fiction, history, nonfiction
Mark Strand (born 1934) - poetry, nonfiction
Eric G. Swedin – science fiction, alternate history, nonfiction
May Swenson (1913–1989) – theatrical plays, poetry, nonfiction

T
Howard Tayler (born 1968) – cartoonist, science fiction
Sandra Tayler (born 1973) – fantasy, science fiction, nonfiction
Samuel W. Taylor (1907–1997) – scriptwriter, history, religious fiction, contemporary fiction, humorous fiction
Douglas Thayer (born 1929) – juvenile, religious fiction, biographies
Emma Lou Thayne (1924–2014) – poetry, historical fiction, songwriter, biographies
Melanie Rae Thon (born 1957) – literary fiction
Wallace Thurman (1902–1934) – literary fiction
David Trottier (Born 1949) – screenplays
Edward Tullidge (1829–1894) – history, nonfiction
Michael O. Tunnell (born 1950) – juvenile, religious fiction, nonfiction

U
Cornelia Ulrich (born 1967) – science, nonfiction
Grant Underwood – history, religion, nonfiction

V
Richard S. Van Wagoner (1946–2010) – history
Suresh Venkatasubramanian – computer science, nonfiction
Anil Virkar – science, engineering, nonfiction
Joseph Vogel – politics, nonfiction
J. Frederic Voros Jr. – songwriter, religious nonfiction, juvenile

W

Dan Wells (born 1977) – horror, fantasy, science fiction, thriller, young adult
Robison Wells (born 1978) – science fiction, thriller, young adult
Maurine Whipple (1903–1992) – religious fiction, historical fiction, history, nonfiction
Tyler Whitesides (born 1987) – fantasy, juvenile
Carol Lynch Williams – juvenile, young adult, fantasy, religious fiction
Terry Tempest Williams (born 1955) – nature, nonfiction
Dan Willis (born 1967) – fantasy, young adult
Michael K. Winder (born 1976) – politics, nonfiction
Anne Wingate (born 1943) - mystery, fantasy, romance fiction
Dave Wolverton (born 1957, also writes as David Farland) – science fiction, fantasy, juvenile, young adult, historical fiction

Y
Blaine Yorgason (born 1942) – contemporary fiction, religious fiction, biographies, nonfiction
Brenton G. Yorgason (1945–2016) – contemporary fiction, religious fiction, nonfiction
Bryan Young (born 1980) – fantasy, juvenile
Margaret Blair Young (born 1955) – historical fiction, literary fiction, scriptwriter

Z
Sara Zarr (born 1970) – young adult fiction, literary fiction

References
Kinkead, Joyce, ed. (1990). Literary Utah: A Bibliographic Guide.

External links
League of Utah writers
Utah Arts Council Literature Program
Utah Juvenile Literature website

Lists of American writers
Writers
 List